Byron Joseph LaForest (April 18, 1917 – May 5, 1947) was a Canadian professional baseball player. He was born in Edmundston, New Brunswick.

LaForest is one of many ballplayers who only appeared in the major leagues during World War II.

LaForest played third base for the last two months of the 1945 season with the Boston Red Sox, hitting .250 (51-for-204) with 2 home runs, 16 RBI, and 25 runs scored in 52 games.  He was an above-average defensive player, making just 5 errors in 147 total chances at third base, and recording 6 putouts (with no errors) in a few appearances as an outfielder.

In 1944 LaForest played in the outfield for the Boston Red Sox affiliate, Scranton of the Eastern League. He hit .296 with 101 runs batted in which earned him a promotion in 1945 to the top Red Sox farm club in Louisville, Kentucky. While playing for the Louisville Colonels he tied an American Association record by getting six hits in six at bats in a game against Minneapolis.

LaForest first appeared in a major league game on August 26, 1945 during a double header against Philadelphia. He had two home runs and five hits in total in the two games to lead the Red Sox to a pair of victories. Later that week Laforest singled and scored the only run of the game to help the Red Sox defeat the New York Yankees. On August 31 he had four more hits, including two triples in another double header with Philadelphia.

LaForest died at the age of 30 in Arlington, Massachusetts after coming down with pneumonia in the winter of 1946. Still weakened from his illness he suffered a heart attack in Florida during spring training. He was inducted into the Boston Park League Baseball Hall of Fame in 1986.

See also
Shearon, Jim (1994). Canada's Baseball Legends. Malin Head Press. .

References

External links

1917 births
1947 deaths
Baseball people from New Brunswick
Boston Red Sox players
Canadian expatriate baseball players in the United States
Major League Baseball third basemen
Major League Baseball players from Canada
People from Edmundston